Rudolph I (died 1262) was the Roman Catholic bishop of the Diocese of Schwerin and prince of the Prince-Bishopric of Schwerin from 1249 until his death.

In 1239, shortly before the start of Rudolph's term, Bützow had been made the main residence of his prince-bishopric. In 1248, a collegiate church had been founded in Bützow.

Rudolph I is primarily known for his disputes with Duke Pribislaw I of Mecklenburg. To protect his seat in Bützow, he built a castle close to the border between his prince-bishopric and the Lordship of Parchim-Richenberg, in ecclesiastical respect part of his diocese, but not of his prince-bishopric. Pribislaw I saw this castle as a direct threat and burned it down. He imprisoned Rudolph in his dungeon, but soon released him for a small ransom. 

Rudolph then tried to overthrow Pribislaw. On his instigation, both an imperial ban and a papal ban were proclaimed against Pribislaw. In 1255, Pribislaw was taken prisoner and handed over to Rudolph. Pribislaw was removed from power and his territory was divided among his brothers and his brother-in-law, the Count of Schwerin. When Rudolph died in 1262, Pribislaw hoped he would be restored to power, but his brothers refused to do this.

References 
 
 

13th-century German nobility
Year of birth unknown
1262 deaths
13th-century German Roman Catholic bishops
Roman Catholic Prince-Bishops of Schwerin